Flowerpot Men may refer to:

Bill and Ben, the Flower Pot Men, a BBC television series for children (1952–54) and associated comic strip in Robin children's magazine
The Flower Pot Men, a British pop group from the 1960s
The Flowerpot Men, a British electronic group from the 1980s